The women's skeleton at the 2006 Winter Olympics took place on 16 February, at the Cesana Pariol.

Results
Two-time world champion Maya Pedersen set the two fastest times to win the gold medal, Switzerland's first gold of the games.  Shelley Rudman won silver, Great Britain's only medal of the games.  Mellisa Hollingsworth-Richards took bronze for Canada, the first Olympic medal in skeleton won by a Canadian athlete.

Rudman's hometown of Pewsey, Wiltshire held a twelve-hour canoe marathon to raise money to help her go to Turin after she was disqualified from the 2005 world championships in Calgary for her sled being  overweight after she was denied funding by the British Bobsleigh and Skeleton Federation. Pederson trained for the event by watching a video of the course on a big screen in her living room while lying down on her sled on a table.

References

Skeleton at the 2006 Winter Olympics
2006 in women's sport
Women's events at the 2006 Winter Olympics